Pep Ventura is the name of a Barcelona metro station located in the municipality of Badalona, in the metropolitan area of Barcelona, and served by L2. It was the northern terminus of that line until 2010, when it was extended into the town centre and into the station Badalona Pompeu Fabra.

It was opened in 1985, then as part of L4, which had been extended to there from La Pau. In 2002, though, that branch became part of L2. This station is located under Avinguda del Marquès de Mont-roig, next to Plaça Pep Ventura, in Badalona.

Name
The station was named after musician Josep Maria "Pep" Ventura (1819–1875), called "the father of the sardana", the national dance of Catalonia.

Services

External links

Pep Ventura metro station at Trenscat.com

Barcelona Metro line 2 stations
Railway stations in Badalona
Railway stations in Spain opened in 1985